Raffaele Mancino (born 8 December 1965) is an Italian weightlifter. He competed in the men's middle heavyweight event at the 1996 Summer Olympics.

References

1965 births
Living people
Italian male weightlifters
Olympic weightlifters of Italy
Weightlifters at the 1996 Summer Olympics
Place of birth missing (living people)